Football was the optional sport at the 1979 edition. Between 1985 to 2019, football was a recognized mandatory sport. The women's football competition began in the 1993 edition as optional event. Due the creation of the FISU University Football World Cup in 2019, the sport will no longer be part of the Summer World University Games program starting at that year. With this change, the number of mandatory sports will be kept at fifteen, since the place will be occupied by badminton which after five editions as an optional sport turned a compulsory sport.

History

Format

Men's tournaments

Results

Medal table

* = Host

Participating nations

 —

Women's tournaments

Results

Medal table

* = Host

Participating nations

 —

Combinated medal table
Last updated after the 2019 Summer Universiade

See also
FIFA World Cup
FIFA Women's World Cup
Football at the Summer Olympics
Football at the Youth Olympic Games

Notes

References
RSSSF archive

 
Sports at the Summer Universiade
Universiade
University and college soccer competitions